Christmas Like This may refer to:

 Christmas Like This (Jump5 album)
 Christmas Like This (Ayiesha Woods album)